The 1982 Atlanta Falcons season was the franchise's 17th season in the National Football League (NFL). The team qualified for the postseason and won the NFC West for the second time in three years. Due to the players strike, this was not recognized as divisions were dissolved for this year only. As the lone NFC West team to qualify for the playoffs, Falcons were considered the 1982 first place team when 1983 matchups were determined. The Falcons were the first team to get a taste of being the best in the NFC West during the 49ers' dynasty, as the 49ers, from 1981 to 1997, would hog 13 of 17 NFC West pennants.

Offseason

NFL Draft

Personnel

Staff

Roster

Regular season

Schedule 

Note: Intra-division opponents are in bold text.

Standings

References

External links 
 1982 Atlanta Falcons at Pro-Football-Reference.com

Atlanta Falcons
Atlanta Falcons seasons
Atlanta